Hydrometry is the monitoring of the components of the hydrological cycle including rainfall, groundwater characteristics, as well as water quality and flow characteristics of surface waters.  The etymology of the term hydrometry is from  'water' +  'measure'.

Hydrometrics is a topic in applied science and engineering dealing with Hydrometry. It is an engineering discipline encompassing several different areas. This discipline is primarily related to hydrology but specializing in the measurement of components of the hydrological cycle particularly the bulk quantification of water resources. It encompasses several areas of traditional engineering practices including hydrology, structures, control systems, computer sciences, data management and communications. The International Organization for Standardization formally defines hydrometry as "science of the measurement of water including the methods, techniques and instrumentation used".

See also

References

Hydrology